Out There is a short-lived American adult animated television series created by Ryan Quincy. It aired on IFC for one season from February 22 to April 19, 2013, and was not renewed for a second. Out There was IFC's second animated project following 2005's Hopeless Pictures, which also lasted one season. The series is currently available on Hulu.

Plot
Set in a world populated by anthropomorphic bears, the show chronicles the coming-of-age misadventures of socially awkward Chad, his little brother Jay, and his best friend Chris. Living in the small town of Holford (based on the real-life city of Holdrege, Nebraska), the boys wander its surreal, bleak landscape waiting out their last few years of adolescence. Other characters include Chad's parents, Wayne and Rose, as well as Chris's single mother, Joanie, and her disastrous boyfriend, Terry, and Sharla, the object of Chad's affection.

Cast and characters
 Ryan Quincy as Chad Stevens - Protagonist
 Justin Roiland as Chris Novak - Chad's best friend
 Kate Micucci as Jay Stevens - Chad's little brother
 John DiMaggio as Wayne Stevens - Chad's dad
 Megan Mullally as Rose Stevens - Chad's mom
 Pamela Adlon as Joanie Novak - Chris's mom
 Fred Armisen as Terry Rosachristas - Joanie's boyfriend 
 Linda Cardellini as Sharla Lemoyne - Chad's love interest

Guest stars
Guest voices for Out There include:
 Selma Blair as Destiny - Chad's crush 
 Jemaine Clement as Tenebres - Jay's bully/Destiny's little brother
 Nick Offerman as Doug Lemoyne - Sharla's dad
 Stephen Root as Mr. Shooty - Frosty King owner
 Jason Schwartzman as Benjamin Brent - Frosty King employee/Chad's enemy
 Christian Slater as Johnny Slade - most feared kid in Holford
 Sarah Silverman as Amy Corn - leader of the yearbook club

Episodes

Reception
The show received mixed reviews. Robert Lloyd of the Los Angeles Times gave it a positive review. He compared the animation favorably to Bob's Burgers and said that the series has "a gentler, more delicate, behind-the-beat groove". New York Times calls it "dreamy, charming, deeply personal." Mixed reviews included Boston Globe's, Matthew Gilbert's, who called it "just fine", continuing, "the sincerity is refreshing in an animated context, but the characters and the stories are old hat." A review by PopMatters stated "It is often funny, but it could be funnier if it were wed to more coherent storytelling."  A review from Slant Magazine declared "Out There presents an array of by-the-numbers boyhood scenarios that frequently feel stale, having an indistinct, been-there-done-that vibe."

References

External links
 Official website

2010s American adult animated television series
2010s American comedy-drama television series
2013 American television series debuts
2013 American television series endings
American adult animated comedy television series
American adult animated drama television series
American flash adult animated television series
English-language television shows
IFC (American TV channel) original programming
Television series set in the 1990s
Television series by 20th Century Fox Television
Television series by Fox Television Animation
Television series created by Ryan Quincy
Animated television series about dysfunctional families
Television shows set in Nebraska
Teen animated television series
Animated television series about bears